The Northern Main Line is a  long electrified railway in Sweden, between Gävle or Storvik and Ånge. The railway consists of single track except the parts between Mo grindar and Holmsveden, Kilafors and Bollnäs, and Ramsjö and Ovansjö, a total of  double track.

The railway passes Gävle or Storvik, Ockelbo, Ljusdal and Ånge.

External links
 Trafikverket page on Norra stambanan 

Railway lines in Sweden
Rail transport in Gävleborg County
Rail transport in Västernorrland County
1881 establishments in Sweden
Railway lines opened in 1881